In chemistry, the cyclopentadienyl anion or cyclopentadienide is an aromatic species with a formula of  and abbreviated as Cp−. It is formed from the deprotonation of the molecule cyclopentadiene.

Properties 
The cyclopentadienyl anion is a planar, cyclic, regular-pentagonal ion; it has 6 π-electrons (4n + 2, where n = 1), which fulfills Hückel's rule of aromaticity. 

The structure shown is a composite of five resonance contributors in which each carbon atom carries part of the negative charge.

Salts of the cyclopentadienyl anion can be stable, e.g., sodium cyclopentadienide. It can also coordinate as a ligand to metal atoms, forming coordination compounds known as cyclopentadienyl complexes. Biscyclopentadienyl complexes are called metallocenes.

Cyclopentadienyl, and cyclopentadiene, can substitute one or more hydrogens, forming derivatives having covalent bonds. (See Cyclopentadiene#Derivatives)

Abbreviation
The abbreviation Cp for cyclopentadienyl played a role in the naming of element 112, copernicium, for which the originally proposed symbol was Cp. However, as Cp− was already in use as the abbreviation for cyclopentadienyl (and Cp had been used for cassiopeium, a former name of lutetium), the symbol for copernicium was changed to Cn.

See also
Cyclopentadienyl radical, •
Cyclopentadienyl cation, 
Cyclooctatetraenide anion,

References

Anions
Non-benzenoid aromatic carbocycles
Simple aromatic rings